Billen is a surname. Notable people with the surname include:

Andrew Billen (born 1957), British journalist and children's author
 (born 1953), Belgian association football player for Royal Standard de Liège
Matthias Billen (1910–1989), German footballer
Valère Billen (born 1952), Belgian football coach